SKYNET Direct to Home (DTH) is a Satellite television pay TV operator provided nationwide in Myanmar by Shwe Than Lwin Media Co.,Ltd. It was launched in November 2010. Sky Net broadcasts a total 80 channels via Apstar 7 satellite. It also provides internet services in the Pacific Asia area. The company is owned by Sino-Burmese businessman, Kyaw Win who is also the chairman of Skynet. Skynet have media staff and employ more than 2000.

Channels
SKYNET DTH was first launched with 124 channels including Spanish La Liga, Italian Serie A, German Bundesliga, French Ligue 1, Hero I-League, Indian Super League, American Major League Soccer, Australian A-League, NBA, CCL,Saudi Professional League,Saudi Super Cup ,Myanmar National League and other sports and entertainment. It later expanded to 80 channels and acquired media rights of competitions held by UEFA (Euro 2012, UEFA Champions League, Europa League). SKYNET DTH started broadcasting all matches of the Air KBZ Myanmar Lethwei World Championship, Premier League, IPL from the 2013/2014 season after it acquired rights from FA. SKYNET DTH also have media rights of all competitions held by FIFA, enabling SKYNET to broadcast live the FIFA World Cup 2018. SKYNET DTH also have media rights to all of WWE, which broadcasts RAW, Smack Down Live, NXT and all Pay Per Views produced by WWE. After 2021 February, some of the international broadcasting channels were closed including many categories like fox network groups (Now is Walt Disney Asia Pacific), Lifetime, CNN, BBC and More during 2021 Myanmar coup d'état. As 2022 October 1, the total number of channels are now 80.

References

External links
 http://www.skynetdth.com/

Direct broadcast satellite services
Telecommunications companies established in 2010
2010 establishments in Myanmar
Telecommunications companies of Myanmar